Ituri may refer to:

 Ituri Province, a province in the northeastern Democratic Republic of the Congo
 Ituri Interim Administration, an interim administration in the northeastern Democratic Republic of the Congo
 Ituri District, a former district of the Democratic Republic of the Congo
 Ituri Rainforest
 Ituri River